Brejinho (Little Swamp) is a city  in the state of Pernambuco, Brazil. The population in 2020, according with IBGE was 7,488 and the area is 106.3 km².

Geography

 State - Pernambuco
 Region - Sertão Pernambucano
 Boundaries - Paraiba state   (N and W);  São José do Egito  and Terezinha  (S);   Itapetim  (E).
 Area - 106.3 km²
 Elevation - 737 m
 Hydrography - Pajeú River
 Vegetation - Caatinga hiperxerófila
 Climate - semi arid - hot and dry
 Annual average temperature - 22.5 c
 Distance to Recife - 410 km

Economy

The main economic activity in Brejinho is agribusiness, especially the breeding of cattle, goats, sheep, pigs, chickens;  and planting of corn and beans.

Economic Indicators

Economy by Sector
2006

Health Indicators

References

Municipalities in Pernambuco